Area code 816 is a telephone area code in the North American Numbering Plan (NANP) for Kansas City, St. Joseph, and all or part of 15 surrounding counties in northwestern Missouri. The numbering plan area originally comprised most of the northern and western two-thirds of the state, bordering with Arkansas, Illinois, Iowa, Kansas, Nebraska, and Oklahoma, but has been reduced to a ribbon bordering Kansas. 816 is one of the original 86 area codes created in 1947.

History
When the American Telephone and Telegraph Company (AT&T) created a universal North American telephone numbering plan for Operator Toll Dialing in 1947, Missouri was divided into two numbering plan areas (NPAs). Area code 816 served points generally north and west of Columbia and Jefferson City, while area code 314 served the eastern third of the state, including St. Louis. In 1951, a third NPA with area code 417 was created for southwestern Missouri, including the cities of Branson, Joplin, and Springfield. This reduced 816 to the northern third of Missouri, including the Kansas City metropolitan area. Despite roughly doubling the population in the Kansas City metropolitan area during the second half of the 20th century, area code 816 retained its 1951 boundaries for 45 years. 

By late 1996, the proliferation of cell phones and market reforms related to deregulation by the Telecommunications Act of 1996 required an additional area code for northern Missouri. On April 10, 1997, Southwestern Bell declared a Jeopardy Situation with the Missouri Public Service Commission (MPSC), which oversees telecommunications in the state, and the North American Numbering Plan Administration (NANPA). On July 28, 1997, Bellcore and the NANPA, announced an area code split, in which the Kansas City metropolitan area and the St. Joseph area would retain area code 816, while the remainder of the NPA would receive the new area code 660. Area code 660 comprised the rural eastern and northwestern portions of the then-current 816 area to minimize disruption to subscribers in the more densely populated urban areas.  The rate centers of Lexington (259) and Warrensburg (429) moved to 660, despite being generally considered a part of the Kansas City area.

On June 4, 1997, the MPSC announced the split for October 12, 1997, with a permissive dialing period ending on April 19, 1998, during which calls could be placed with either area code.

In 2000, the Missouri PSC announced plans to create an overlay plan for the numbering plan area. On February 20, 2001, the overlay was approved by the North American Numbering Plan Administration (NANPA), by assigning area code 975 for service starting October 20, 2001, which was later postponed to May 5, 2002. The subsequent implementation of code preservation measures, such as number pooling, eliminated the immediate need for additional central office prefixes, prompting the MPSC to suspend implementation indefinitely. Despite Kansas City's continued growth, the Kansas City area was served by only 816 for over twenty additional years.

Prior to October 2021, area code 816 had telephone numbers assigned for the central office code 988. In 2020, 988 was designated nationwide as a dialing code for the National Suicide Prevention Lifeline, which created a conflict for exchanges that permit seven-digit dialing. This area code was therefore scheduled to transition to ten-digit dialing by October 24, 2021.

An October 2021 exhaust analyses by the NANPA projected central office code exhaustion by 2023. As a result, an overlay with area code 975 is scheduled for October 13, 2023.

Service area

Major cities

 Blue Springs
 Gladstone
 Grandview
 Independence
 Kansas City
 Lee's Summit
 Liberty
 North Kansas City
 Platte City
 Raymore
 Raytown
 Smithville
 St. Joseph
 Kearney

Other cities

 Archie
 Belton
 Cleveland
 Freeman
 Garden City
 Greenwood
 Harrisonville
 Holden
 Peculiar
 Pleasant Hill
 Savannah

References

External links

 List of exchanges from AreaCodeDownload.com, 816 Area Code
 History 

816
816
Telecommunications-related introductions in 1947